María del Rosario Mendoza (stage name, Rossy Mendoza; June 6, 1950) is a Mexican vedette, actress, dancer and singer. During the 1970s–1980s, she was one of the highest grossing artists in the Mexican sex comedy film genre.

Biography
Rossy Mendoza was born in Vícam, one of eight Yaqui villages in the south of the Mexican state of Sonora. She began her career in the mid-1960s when she was still a teenager, slowly making a name for herself in the entertainment industry by performing in the main cabarets of Sonora. She also appeared in well known Mexican magazines including Cinelandia, Cine mundial and Siempre. In the late 1960s her physique became athletic and voluptuous, in contrast to the slimness it had in her early years, and she had cosmetic surgery on her nose to improve her facial appearance.

In 1964 she made her first appearance at the Teatro Lírico in Mexico City, where other prominent figures such as Tin Tan, El Santo and Sergio Corona performed.

In 1968 she joined the cast of the cabaret El Capri, where she worked alongside vedettes such as Yolanda "Tongolele" Montes and the Argentine Zulma Faiad. She appeared in several television programmes such as Sabadito Alegre, with Paco Malgesto, where she remained for several months. In 1970 she worked with the comedian Adalberto Martínez (better known as "Resortes") in El Tenorio Comico at the Blanquita Theater in Mexico City. She appeared there for many seasons, accompanied by an orchestra and a ballet of 18 dancers. Her performances alternated with singers such as Celia Cruz, Enrique Guzmán, Mike Laure, Sonia Lopez and Dámaso Pérez Prado. At the same time she was hired by the Vallejo Family to perform in La Caravan Corona, in which she appeared from 1971 to 1982. This consisted of groups of stars from the show that traveled throughout Mexico and in which she performed with acts such as Los Polivoces (Eduardo Manzano and Enrique Cuenca), Juan Gabriel, Amalia Mendoza and Los Rebeldes del Rock. In 1971 she began a successful season at the El Clóset nightclub, where she shared top billing with the vedette Olga Breeskin. She also ventured into the fotonovelas of the time and recorded some records.

By the end of the 1970s she was already a big star in cabarets and nightclubs, earning the title of Supervedette or Primera Vedette. She headed the cabaret show Terraza Casino, accompanied by the Hector Halal orchestra. She also worked at El Cadillac, El Rondinella, El Clóset, Las Galaxias, El Can Can and El Quid, among other places.

Represented by her artistic agent, Mrs. Lonka Becker, made her film debut in 1970 with the actor Gaspar Henaine "Capulina" in the film Capulina contra los vampiros. In 1971 she participated in the film El siverguenza along with Mauricio Garcés. In her cinematographic career she participates in more than 52 films with stars such as Vicente Fernández, Andrés García, Jorge Rivero, Julio Alemán, Mario Almada, Ana Luisa Peluffo and Isela Vega, among others.

In the theater of comedy she acts in several theatrical plays, in which she was directed by Óscar Ortiz de Pinedo, Rafael Banquells, Jose Diaz Morales and others. Her first stage play  was with the comedians Emilio Brillas and Polo Ortín. She makes a tour in Mexico with the play Elena para los miercoles, with Jorge Ortiz de Pinedo. Another of her more outstanding stage plays was La locura del sexo with Andrés García.

In the television, she incursed in the telenovelas in 1979, in Yara, with Angélica María. She also participated in the celebrated TV show Variedades de medianoche, with Manuel Valdés.

In the decade of the 1990s, her appearances are sporadic. In 1993 she returns to the Blanquita Theater, to alternate with the Sonora Matancera. At the end of the decade she was diagnosed with cancer. In 1999, Mendoza participated in the theater show Las inolvidables de la noche, with also vedettes Amira Cruzat, Wanda Seux, Grace Renat and Malú Reyes.

She was also a model of renowned photographers like Nadine Markova and Paulina Lavista and the famous painter José Luis Cuevas. In addition to Cuevas, other painters have shaped their beauty Ricardo Garcia Mora, Juan Buitimea (painter belonging to the Yaqui tribe), among others.

In 2016, Rossy along with the vedettes Olga Breeskin, Lyn May, Wanda Seux and Princesa Yamal, is one of the protagonists of the documentary Beauties of the Night by the filmmaker María José Cuevas.

Master Dámaso Pérez Prado composed the Mambo "The Waist of Rossy" in honor of her slim figure.

Filmography

References

External links

1950 births
Living people
Burlesque performers
Mexican vedettes
Mexican film actresses
Mexican television actresses
Mexican female dancers
Mexican women singers